The Abdullah bin Khalifa Stadium, formerly known as Duhail Stadium, is a football stadium in Doha, Qatar.

History
The construction of the stadium was set in 2011 and completed by February 2013. The first phase was completed in May 2012. The stadium was officially inaugurated on 15 February 2013 with the first match taking place in the stadium being a Qatar Stars League fixture with the home team Lekhwiya facing off against Al Khor.

The official capacity is 9,000 people, and the stadium is located within the complex of the Internal Security Forces in the Duhail district of the capital Doha.

The entry process of the spectators is secured through 25 gates around the stadium.

The stadium hosted nine matches during 24th Arabian Gulf Cup.

Recent tournament results

24th Arabian Gulf Cup

References

Football venues in Qatar
Sports venues completed in 2013